Castabala, also known as Hieropolis and Hierapolis was a city in Cilicia (modern southern Turkey), near the Ceyhan River (ancient Pyramus).

The Turkish town of Kırmıtlı, in the Osmaniye district of Osmaniye Province, sits atop the ruins of the ancient city.

The ruins were first identified from inscriptions in March 1890 by the British explorer J. Theodore Bent.

Early history 
Castabala was one of the cities of the Late Hitite period. The name Castabala was probably of Luwian origin. The city was captured by Achaemenid Empire and became part of the Cilician satrapy and then by Alexander the Great. First mentioned in literature when Alexander the Great made a stage before the Battle of Issos.

During the Hellenistic period and Roman period it was called Hieropolis, known as either Hieropolis on the Pyramos or as Hieropolis Castabala. In the first century BC, after the Cilician pirates were defeated, it became the capital of Tarcondimotus a ruler of a small client kingdom. Later, the city became a part of Cappadocia Province in the Roman Empire. 

At the city there was the sanctuary of Artemis Perasia (Περασίας Ἀρτέμιδος ἱερόν). According to Strabo, the priestesses were walking with naked feet over hot embers without pain. He also added that "some tell us over and over the same story of Orestes and Tauropolus, asserting that she was called Perasian because she was brought from the other side."

Roman Period
The city was important enough in the Roman province of Cilicia Secunda to become a suffragan of its capital Anazarbus's Metropolitan Archbishopric, but would fade.

Titular see 
The Diocese of Castabala is a titular bishopric of the Catholic Church reflecting its active status in Late Antiquity.

It has had the following incumbents, of the lowest (episcopal) rank :
 John Milner 1803.03.06 – 1826.04.19)
 John Murdoch (1833.06.04 – 1865.12.15)
 Louis Aloysius Lootens (1868.03.03 – 1898.01.12)Belgian, as Apostolic Vicar of Idaho and Montana (USA) (1868.03.03 – 1876.02.27) and as Auxiliary Bishop of Vancouver Island (Canada) (1876.02.27 – 1898.01.12)
 Rocco Tornatore, Pontifical Institute for Foreign Missions (1889.11.18 – 1908)
 John William Shaw (1910.02.07 – 1911.03.11) as Coadjutor Bishop of San Antonio (Texas, USA) (1910.02.07 – 1911.03.11), later succeeding as Bishop of San Antonio (1911.03.11 – 1918.01.25), later Metropolitan Archbishop of New Orleans (USA) (1918.01.25 – 1934.11.02)
 Juan José Marcos Zapata (1913.05.30 – 1951.05.13)
 Doroteo Fernández y Fernández (1956.03.06 – 1971.07.22)
 Patrick Ebosele Ekpu (1971.06.05 – 1973.07.05) (later Archbishop)
 Felipe Tejeda García, Missionaries of the Holy Spirit (M.Sp.S.) (2000.01.29 – ... ):, Auxiliary Bishop emeritus of México (Mexico)

Gallery

See also
Bodrumkale

References

Source and External links 

 GCatholic, with titular incumbent biography links

Catholic titular sees in Asia
Archaeological sites in the Mediterranean Region, Turkey
History of Osmaniye Province
Ancient Greek archaeological sites in Turkey
Roman towns and cities in Turkey
Former populated places in Cilicia
Populated places in ancient Cilicia